Akankshya Yojana is a social welfare programme initiated by the Government of Odisha, in India, for tribal people in that state.

Akankshya Yojana provides hostels to tribal students pursuing higher education in various fields. In 2015, the Government of Odisha provided facilitated hostels to 3.5 lakh students falling under the Scheduled Caste (SC) and Scheduled Tribe (ST) category.

References

External links

Ethnic groups in Odisha
Adivasi
Scheduled Castes
Scheduled Tribes of India
Government schemes in Odisha